Sigtuna Municipality (Sigtuna kommun) is a municipality in Stockholm County in east central Sweden.

The municipality is a part of Metropolitan Stockholm.

The municipality consists of several former local government units and was formed in 1971. It got its name from the small, but very old, City of Sigtuna, but the seat was placed in the larger modern town of Märsta.

The three towns of the municipality are Märsta (pop. 23,000), Sigtuna (pop. 8,000) and Rosersberg (pop. 1,400), of which Märsta is the municipal seat and Sigtuna with its old and important history is a popular tourist destination.

Demography

Population development

2022 by district
This is a demographic table based on Sigtuna Municipality's electoral districts in the 2022 Swedish general election sourced from SVT's election platform, in turn taken from SCB official statistics.

Residents include everyone registered as living in the district, regardless of age or citizenship status. Valid voters indicate Swedish citizens above the age of 18 who therefore can vote in general elections. Left vote and right vote indicate the result between the two major blocs in said district in the 2022 general election. Employment indicates the share of people between the ages of 20 and 64 who are working taxpayers. Foreign background denotes residents either born abroad or with two parents born outside of Sweden. Median income is the received monthly income through either employment, capital gains or social grants for the median adult above 20, also including pensioners in Swedish kronor. College graduates indicates any degree accumulated after high school.

There were 50,180 residents, among whom 33,030 were Swedish citizens of voting age. 42.5 % voted for the left coalition and 54.6 % for the right coalition.

Industry

In the municipality lies the largest workplace in Sweden, the Arlanda Airport, with 13,000 employees in 200 companies. As a result, Sigtuna is travelled through by 18,300,000 visitors yearly, and has the fourth most hotel stays, following to the commercial and regional centres Stockholm, Gothenburg and Malmö.

Swedavia, the Swedish airport management company, has its head office on the airport property. Scandinavian Airlines previously had its head office on the airport property.

International relations

Twin towns – Sister cities
The municipality is twinned with:

 Sønderborg Municipality in Denmark
 Rakvere in Estonia
 Raisio in Finland
 Porsgrunn in Norway

References

External links
 
 

 
Municipalities of Stockholm County